Melrose Park is a neighborhood just northwest of downtown Lexington, Kentucky, United States. Its boundaries are Forbes Road to the west, Main Street to the north, CSX railroad tracks to the east, and Manchester Street to the south.

Neighborhood statistics

 Population in 2000: 505
 Land area: 0.165
 Population density: 3,064 people per square mile (1,183/km2)
 Median income: $38,887

References

Neighborhoods in Lexington, Kentucky